Alessandro Vitali (1580–1650) was an Italian painter of the late-Renaissance and Baroque periods, born at Urbino. He was a follower of Federico Barocci.

References

1580 births
1650 deaths
People from Urbino
16th-century Italian painters
Italian male painters
17th-century Italian painters
Umbrian painters
Italian Baroque painters